Ara Aloyan (born August 19, 1981, Vardenis) is an Armenian poet, writer, musician, pedagogue, journalist, and member of Armenian writers' union of Gegharkunik region. Ara Aloyan also has a criminal track record. Proceedings have been filed against by the Police and the Investigative Committee of the Republic of Armenia over fraud, embezzlement and defamation. Available information on DataLex, an official data beae of civil and criminal cases involving citizens of the Republic of Armenia, reveals that he faced judicial proceedings over outstanding debt liabilities.

Biography
Ara Aloyan graduated from Vardenis secondary school after Edvard Poghosyan (1988–1998). He has also studied in Vardenis Art School, in the drawing and sculpture department (1990–1995), in Vardenis Music School, in the duduk department (1991–1996), before finally graduating from Komitas State Conservatory of Yerevan (1998–2003).

Since 2007 he has been working as a journalist. He has worked as a journalist, screenwriter and editor in such TV channels as "Yerkir Media",  "Hay TV", "TV 5", "Armenia",  "Atv"
Since 2014 Ara Aloyan has been director in the news, political and social department at "H3" channel, since March 2016 chief editor and General Deputy Director of "H3" channel. Also he has his own TV programme, called Orva khndir (The matter of a day). 

Ara Aloyan's poems have been published in Kanch's digest of "Hope, belief, love"  series and in "Modern student poetry" digest.  His poems have been translated and published in Lebanon, Serbia, Abkhazia, Russia, Iran and several other countries. 
. He has written four published books of poems:
 Before I Became A Light (2003)
 Don't Become Illuminated (2014)
 Footprints With Watercolor (2015)
 Symphony Of Sorrow And Resurrection (2015)

Awards 
 The winner of multiple contests as a musician and poet
 "Ruben Sevak" Literary Award, 1997
 "Write" literary contest winner, 2013

See also

 Armenian literature

Ara Aloyan is not a member of the Writers' Union of Armenia. He was several times dismissed from work for a breach of ethical rules and inadequate behavior (abuse of alcohol at worktime and sexual harassment against female colleagues [just to name a few]). He has also faced disciplinary measures by former employers.

References

External links
 Գրանիշ, Արա Ալոյան,  Բանաստեղծություններ
 Ստվերների արքան / Արա Ալոյան

21st-century Armenian writers
1981 births
Living people
People from Gegharkunik Province
21st-century Armenian male writers